is a Japanese manga series written and illustrated by Sui Ishida. It has been irregularly serialized on Shueisha's Tonari no Young Jump website since May 2021 and in Weekly Young Jump from October 2021 to February 2022.

Synopsis
 has great fighting skills as well as a strong sense of justice, and also always gets good grades in his class. His friend  is the complete opposite of Azuma: he does not listen in class, and is a bystander when Azuma fights. Different as they might be, their bond is very strong nevertheless. They live in Yamato Prefecture, where the district has almost been destroyed by Choujins, humans with supernatural abilities. When the two are returning home, they encounter a Choujin who threatens to kill them. With no other way of escaping, the two decided to become Choujins themselves.

Publication
Choujin X, written and illustrated by Sui Ishida, was first announced in November 2020. With an irregular serialization, with chapters released according to Ishida's own schedule, Choujin X began serialization on Shueisha's Tonari no Young Jump website on May 10, 2021. It was also serialized in Weekly Young Jump from October 14, 2021, to February 4, 2022, only continuing its serialization on the website. Shueisha released its first two tankōbon volume on December 17, 2021.

The series is simultaneously published on  Viz Media's website in English, and Shueisha's Manga Plus online platform in English, Indonesian, Portuguese, Spanish, and Russian.

Volume list

Chapters not yet in tankōbon format
These chapters have yet to be published in a tankōbon volume.

Reception
The first and second volumes sold 33,113 and 29,852 copies (respectively) in their first week; they sold 40,141 and 36,085 copies (respectively) in their second week. By December 2022, the manga had sold over 1 million copies.

The series ranked 13th in the Nationwide Bookstore Employees' Recommended Comics of 2023.

References

External links
  
 
 
 

Action anime and manga
Japanese webcomics
Seinen manga
Shueisha manga
Supernatural anime and manga
Viz Media manga
Webcomics in print